Matthew Jorysz (born 22 December 1992) is an English organist and pianist. He is Assistant Organist at Westminster Abbey.

Jorysz was organ scholar at Salisbury Cathedral from 2011 to 2012 before reading music at Clare College, Cambridge, where he was the Sir William McKie organ scholar for the chapel choir under the directorship of Graham Ross. During this time he accompanied the Choir in broadcasts and recordings as well as tours to Europe and the USA, including a performance at the Library of Congress.

Jorysz was appointed as organ scholar at Westminster Abbey in September 2015 and subsequently assistant organist in January 2016. He played at the state funeral of Queen Elizabeth II in September 2022.

Discography 
Requiem: Music for All Saints & All Souls (Choir of Clare College, Cambridge).
Ascendit Deus: Music for Ascensiontide & Pentecost (Choir of Clare College, Cambridge).
Remembrance (Choir of Clare College, Cambridge).
Haec dies: Music for Easter (Choir of Clare College, Cambridge).
Sphinx (Hamish McLaren, countertenor; Matthew Jorysz, piano).
Persian Love Songs (Hamish McLaren, countertenor; Matthew Jorysz, piano).

References 

Living people
1992 births
English classical organists
British male organists
Alumni of Clare College, Cambridge
21st-century organists
21st-century English male musicians
Male classical organists